The Treaty of St. Louis is the name of a series of treaties signed between the United States and various Native American tribes from 1804 through 1824.  The fourteen treaties were all signed in the St. Louis, Missouri area.

The Treaty of St. Louis was signed on November 7, 1825 (proclaimed on December 30, 1825) between William Clark on behalf of the United States and delegates from the Shawnee Nation. In this treaty, the Shawnee ceded lands to the United States near Cape Girardeau . In return for Cape Girardeau , the United States government gave the Shawnee a sum of 11,000 dollars and leased to them a blacksmith shop for five years providing all tools and 300 pounds of iron annually. Moreover, peace and friendship between the two nations were renewed and perpetuated.

See also
 Osage Treaty (disambiguation), several treaties
List of treaties
Indian Boundary Park - Chicago
First Treaty of Prairie du Chien
Second Treaty of Prairie du Chien
Third Treaty of Prairie du Chien
Fourth Treaty of Prairie du Chien
Treaty of Chicago

References

External links 
Kappler Project - Text of the 1825 Treaty

1825 treaties
United States and Native American treaties